Captain Blood is a 1924 American silent adventure film based on the 1922 novel Captain Blood, His Odyssey by Rafael Sabatini. Produced and distributed by the Vitagraph Company of America, the film is directed by David Smith, brother of Vitagraph founder Albert E. Smith. Early silent film hero J. Warren Kerrigan stars along with resident Vitagraph leading actress Jean Paige, who was also married to Albert E. Smith.

Plot summary

Cast 

 J. Warren Kerrigan as Captain Peter Blood
 Jean Paige as Arabella Bishop
 Charlotte Merriam as Mary Traill
 James W. Morrison as Jeremy Pitt
 Allan Forrest as Lord Julian Wade
 Bertram Grassby as Don Diego
 Otis Harlan as Corliss
 Jack Curtis as Wolverstone
 Wilfrid North as Colonel Bishop
 Otto Matieson as Lord Jeffreys
 Robert Bolder as Admiral van der Kuylen
 Templar Saxe as Governor Steed
 Henry A. Barrows as Lord Willoughby
 Boyd Irwin as Levasseur
 Henry Hebert as Captain Hobart
 Miles McCarthy as Capt. Caverly
 Frank Whitson as Baron de Rivarol
 Helen Howard as Mistress Baynes
 Tom McGuire as Farmer Baynes
 Robert Milasch as Kent
 William Eugene as Don Esteban
 George B. Williams as Maj. Mallard 
 Omar Whitehead as Don Miguel
 Muriel Paull as Mademoiselle d'Ogeron
 George J. Lewis as Henri d'Ogeron
 Julie Bishop as Little Girl

Preservation status 
A print restored by the Library of Congress was shown at the Pordenone Silent Film Festival in 2018.

Remake 
In 1925, Warner Brothers was on the verge of taking over the historic Vitagraph Company. When Warners decided to remake Captain Blood in 1935 with Errol Flynn, they would have owned the screen rights to the Sabatini novel which came as part of the Vitagraph buyout.

References

External links 

 
 
 
 
 Lobby poster
 Spanish language lobby poster

1924 films
1920s historical adventure films
American historical adventure films
American silent feature films
Films based on British novels
Vitagraph Studios films
Films directed by David Smith (director)
1924 adventure films
American black-and-white films
Lost American films
1920s American films
Silent historical adventure films
1920s English-language films